Abbey Mills Pumping Station is a sewage pumping station in Mill Meads, East London, operated by Thames Water. The pumping station lifts sewage from the London sewerage system into the Northern Outfall Sewer and the Lee Tunnel, which both run to Beckton Sewage Treatment Works.

The original pumping station, designed by engineer Joseph Bazalgette, Edmund Cooper, and architect Charles Driver, was built between 1865 and 1868, housing eight beam engines by Rothwell & Co. of Bolton. Two engines on each arm of a cruciform plan, with an elaborate Byzantine style, described as The Cathedral of Sewage. Another of Bazalgette's designs, Crossness Pumping Station, is located south of the River Thames at Crossness, at the end of the Southern Outfall Sewer.

History
The pumping station was built at the site of an earlier watermill owned by the former Stratford Langthorne Abbey, from which it gained the name "Abbey Mills". It was first recorded as Wiggemulne in 1312, i.e., "the mill of a man called Wicga", an Old English personal name, and subsequently became associated with the abbey. The abbey lay between the Channelsea River and Marsh Lane (Manor Road). It was dissolved in 1538. By 1840, the North Woolwich railway ran through the site, and it began to be used to establish factories, and ultimately the sewage pumping stations.

Purpose
Abbey Mills Pumping Station was constructed to lift sewage between the two Low Level Sewers and the Northern Outfall Sewer, which was built in the 1860s to carry the increasing amount of sewage produced in London away from the centre of the city to the sewage treatment plant at Beckton.

Details of the pumps in the year 1912/13 were as follows:

The pumping capability was increased with the addition of gas engine driven pumps. Details of the operation of the pumps in the year 1919/20 were as follows:

Two Moorish styled chimneys – unused since steam power had been replaced by electric motors in 1933 – were demolished in 1941, as it was feared that a strike from German bombs might topple them onto the pumping station.

The building still houses electric pumps – to be used to assist the new facility next door when required.

The main building is Grade II* listed and there are many Grade II-listed ancillary buildings, including the stumps of the demolished chimneys.

Modern pumping station

The modern pumping station (Station F) was designed by architects Allies and Morrison. The original building (Station A) has electrical pumps and these are used to assist the modern pumping station during high flows if required.
It is one of the three principal London pumping stations dealing with foul water.
Both pumping stations are able to discharge flows directly into the Lee Tunnel.

Lee Tunnel

The Lee Tunnel is a sewage tunnel that runs from Abbey Mills to Beckton Sewage Treatment Works and is designed to handle the 16 million tons of overflow sewage that was previously discharged into the River Lea each year at Abbey Mills, as well as the additional wastewater brought to Abbey Mills by the Thames Tideway tunnel. Construction of the Lee Tunnel began in 2012 and it was opened for service in early 2016.

Thames Tideway Scheme

Abbey Mills is the endpoint of the main Thames Tideway tunnel, where sewage will be transferred into the Lee Tunnel and onwards to Beckton for treatment. Both the Lee Tunnel and the main Thames Tideway tunnel also serve as storage reservoirs to store wastewater during heavy rainfall.

Gallery

References

External links
Interior and exterior photos of the pumping station 

Buildings and structures in the London Borough of Newham
Grade II* listed buildings in the London Borough of Newham
Grade II* listed industrial buildings
Grade II listed buildings in the London Borough of Newham
Grade II listed industrial buildings
History of the London Borough of Newham
London water infrastructure
Structures on the Heritage at Risk register in London
Sewage pumping stations
Thames Water
Infrastructure completed in 1868
Former pumping stations
Charles Henry Driver buildings
Mill Meads
1868 in London